This is an episode list of the A&E reality television series Paranormal State. The second column is A&E's episode numbering system from their website.

Series overview

Season 1 (2007-08)

Season 2 (2008)

Season 3 (2009)

Season 4 (2009-2010)

Season 5 (2010-11)

Special

{| class="wikitable plainrowheaders" width="100%"
!! style="background-color: #FFA560; color:#FFFFFF;" width=12% |Title
!! style="background-color: #FFA560; color:#FFFFFF;" width=8% |Original Airdate

Lists of American non-fiction television series episodes